Strumble Head - Llechdafad Cliffs is a Site of Special Scientific Interest (SSSI) in Pembrokeshire, South Wales. It has been designated as a SSSI since January 1954 in an attempt to protect its fragile biological and geological elements.

The site, which runs along a coastal strip some six miles in length on the western edge of the Strumble Head promontory, broadly covers the area from Strumble Head Lighthouse (on Ynys Meicel) in the north to the cliff named Llech Dafad in Welsh ('sheep slab'), spelt as two separate words on Ordnance Survey maps, in the south. The SSSI has an area of 204.63 hectares. It is managed by Natural Resources Wales.

The nearest large settlement is the town of Goodwick, some four miles away, on the east side of the Strumble Head promontory.

Features
This SSSI has been notified as being of both geological and biological importance. It has six special features:
 Maritime cliffs, ledges, and crevices
 Coastal grassland
 Coastal heath
 Dry heath
 Rare plants
 Geology: Ordovician igneous and associated rocks

This diversity of habitats supports a wide range of species, including the chough and the small blue butterfly.

See also
List of Sites of Special Scientific Interest in Pembrokeshire

References

External links
Natural Resources Wales website

Sites of Special Scientific Interest in Pembrokeshire
Cliffs of Pembrokeshire